Everett Historic District is a national historic district located at Everett, Pennsylvania.  The district includes 300 contributing buildings and 1 contributing object in the central business district and surrounding residential area of Everett. The buildings date between about 1830 and 1952, and include notable examples of Gothic Revival and Federal style architecture. Notable non-residential buildings include the U.S. Post Office (1938), Everett Free Library, Zion Lutheran Church, Grace Brethren Church, Barndollar Methodist Church (1860), Everett Hardware Company Building (c. 1915), foundry on North Juniata Street (1874), and Everett Manufacturing Company (1920-1955).

It was added to the National Register of Historic Places in 2003.

References

External links

[ Map] and [ inventory] of resources in the historic district

Historic districts on the National Register of Historic Places in Pennsylvania
Federal architecture in Pennsylvania
Gothic Revival architecture in Pennsylvania
Historic districts in Bedford County, Pennsylvania
Historic American Engineering Record in Pennsylvania
National Register of Historic Places in Bedford County, Pennsylvania